The Ilga is a river in Irkutsk Oblast, Russia.

There are a number of settlements near the river, such as Lukinovo (Лукиново), Bachai (Бачай), Zakharova (Захарова), Timoshino (Тимошино), Butyrina (Бутырина), Kaidakan (Кайдакан), Chichek (Чичек), Kachen (Качень), Znamenka (Знаменка), and Nizhnyaya Sloboda (Нижняя Слобода), mostly in Zhigalovsky District. Ust-Ilga is located by the Lena River at the confluence with the Ilga. In the summer tourists visit the Ilga mainly for rafting.

Course  
The Ilga is a left tributary of the Lena. It flows in a roughly northern direction across the highland area as a mountain river among large boulders within a fairly straight channel. In its middle reaches it enters a wide floodplain where it forms meanders. Shortly before its confluence the Ilga bends and turns east. Finally the Ilga meets the left bank of the Lena by Ust-Ilga village  from its mouth.

The largest tributaries of the Ilga are the Ivda (Ilda) and Kichei from the right and the Typta and Tilik from the left. The river freezes between October and May. Permafrost is prevalent in the river basin.

Flora and fauna
The vegetation of the Ilga river basin is characterized by dense mountain taiga, with spruce, fir and Siberian pine.

The main fish species in the river are dace, lenok, whitefish, taimen, chebak, grayling, pike, Arctic char, minnow and perch.

See also
List of rivers of Russia

References

External links 
Переправа на река Илга первый пошёл 
Pictures - Baikal Nature

Rivers of Irkutsk Oblast
Zhigalovsky District